Yari Dushmani is a 1980 Indian Bollywood film directed by Sikandar Khanna. It stars Sunil Dutt and Reena Roy in pivotal roles.

Cast
 Sunil Dutt as Shankar
 Reena Roy as Pammi
 Amjad Khan as Birju
 Daljit Kaur as Komal
 Agha as Judge
 Bharat Bhushan as Catholic Priest
 Jankidas as Jumbu Dada
 Shakti Kapoor as Garjan Singh

Soundtrack
Lyrics: Rajendra Krishan

External links

1980s Hindi-language films
1980 films
Films scored by Laxmikant–Pyarelal